Clemente Grosso della Rovere ( 1462 – 18 August 1504) was an Italian Roman Catholic bishop and cardinal.

Biography

Clemente Grosso della Rovere was born in Savona, c. 1462, the son of Antonio Grosso and Maria Basso della Rovere, a member of the House of della Rovere.  He was a grand-nephew of Pope Sixtus IV and a nephew of Cardinal Girolamo Basso della Rovere.  One of his brothers, Leonardo Grosso della Rovere, also became a cardinal.

Early in his life, he joined the Conventual Franciscans in Savona.  He then became a Referendary of the Apostolic Signatura.  He was also papal treasurer in Perugia.

On October 27, 1483, he was elected Bishop of Mende.  In 1495, Cardinal Giuliano della Rovere named him vice-legate in Avignon.  He became the rector of the Comtat Venaissin in 1496.  Because of his poor health, he left Avignon on April 11, 1502.

Pope Julius II made him a cardinal priest in the consistory of November 29, 1503.  He received the red hat on December 4, 1503, and head of the titular church of Santi Apostoli on December 6, 1503.  Due to bad health, he retired to Perugia in 1504.

He died in Rome on August 18, 1504.  He was buried in St. Peter's Basilica.

References

Further reading
Ian Verstegen, Patronage and Dynasty: the Rise of the Della Rovere in Renaissance Italy (Truman State University Press, 2007)

1460s births
1504 deaths
16th-century Italian cardinals
Year of birth unknown
Conventual Friars Minor
15th-century Italian Roman Catholic bishops
People from Savona
Della Rovere family